Giovanni Battista Lomellini (Genoa, 1594 - Genoa, 1674) was the 108th Doge of the Republic of Genoa and king of Corsica.

Biography 
His two-year mandate, considered by historians to be quiet and normal, was marked by his gout, which on various occasions prevented him from presiding over public ceremonies. During this period, the Oratory of Saint Philip Neri took over in Genoa. At the end of his mandate, on 24 July 1648, the commission of the supreme syndicators expressed his favorable vote for the appointment of Giovanni Battista Lomellini as perpetual procurator for the rest of his life. He died in Genoa around 1674.

See also 

 Republic of Genoa
 Doge of Genoa

Sources 

 Buonadonna, Sergio. Rosso doge. I dogi della Repubblica di Genova dal 1339 al 1797.

17th-century Doges of Genoa
1594 births
1674 deaths